The Bachchan is a prominent Indian show business family primarily associated with the Hindi film industry. 

The notable members of the family include Amitabh's parents, poet Harivansh Rai Bachchan and social activist Teji Bachchan; their daughter Shweta Bachchan Nanda; their son, actor Abhishek Bachchan; and Abhishek's wife, actress Aishwarya Rai. In 2007, Time listed Amitabh Bachchan and Aishwarya Rai on its list of most influential Indians.

Overview 
The Bachchan family came from an Indian Awadhi Hindu background and they were Chitraguptavanshi Kayasthas that were fluent in several Hindustani dialects (Awadhi, Hindi, Urdu) as well as Persian. The family also has Punjabi ethnic roots through patriarch Amitabh's mother Teji Bachchan (née Suri) and Bengali ethnic roots through wife of Amitabh Jaya Bachchan (née Bhaduri). Bachchan family also has roots in Mangalore region of South India through Abhishek Bachchan's wife Aishwarya Rai Bachchan who hail from Tulu speaking Bunt community.

Amitabh Bachchan is the son of Hindi poet Harivansh Rai Bachchan, who married Shyama and Teji Bachchan. Amitabh's wife is actress Jaya Bachchan. Their children are Shweta Bachchan Nanda and actor Abhishek Bachchan. Shweta is married to Nikhil Nanda, the son of Ritu Nanda and grandson of actor Raj Kapoor. Shweta's children are son Agastya Nanda and daughter Navya Naveli Nanda. Abhishek is married to Aishwarya Rai Bachchan, and they have a daughter named Aaradhya Bachchan. The family stays in the two famous houses, Jalsa and Pratiksha, in Mumbai.

Amitabh has a brother, Ajitabh Bachchan, who has three daughters, Nilima, Naina and Namrita Bachchan, and a son, Bhim Bachchan. Naina is married to actor Kunal Kapoor.

The family residence in Mumbai is called the Jalsa Bungalow.

See also 
 List of Hindi film families
 List of awards and nominations received by Amitabh Bachchan

References 

 
Bollywood film clans
Indian actor-politicians
Hindu families
Amitabh Bachchan